63rd ACE Eddie Awards
February 16, 2013

Feature Film (Dramatic): 
Argo

Feature Film (Comedy or Musical): 
Silver Linings Playbook

The 63rd American Cinema Editors Eddie Awards, which were presented on Saturday, February 16, 2013 at the Beverly Hilton Hotel, honored the best editors in films and television.

Nominees were announced on January 16, 2013.

Winners and nominees

Film
Best Edited Feature Film – Dramatic:

William Goldenberg - Argo
Tim Squyres - Life of Pi
Michael Kahn - Lincoln
Stuart Baird - Skyfall
Dylan Tichenor and William Goldenberg - Zero Dark Thirty

Best Edited Feature Film – Comedy or Musical:

Jay Cassidy and Crispin Struthers - Silver Linings Playbook
Chris Gill - The Best Exotic Marigold Hotel
Melanie Ann Oliver and Chris Dickens - Les Misérables
Andrew Weisblum - Moonrise Kingdom
Jeff Freeman - Ted

Best Edited Animated Feature Film:

Nicolas C. Smith - Brave
Chris Lebenzon and Mark Solomon - Frankenweenie
Joyce Arrastia - Rise of the Guardians
Tim Mertens - Wreck-It Ralph

Best Edited Documentary (Feature):

Malik Bendjelloul - Searching for Sugar Man
Ron Fricke and Mark Magidson - Samsara
Billy McMillin - West of Memphis

Television
Best Edited Half-Hour Series for Television:

Gary Levy - Nurse Jackie for "Handle Your Scandal"
Robert Frazen and Catherine Haight - Girls for "Pilot"
Ryan Case - Modern Family for "Mystery Date"

Best Edited One-Hour Series – Commercial Television:

Skip Macdonald - Breaking Bad for "Dead Freight"
Kelley Dixon - Breaking Bad for "Gliding Over All"
Tom Wilson - Mad Men for "The Other Woman"
Keith Henderson - Nashville for "Pilot"
Andrew Weisblum - Smash for "Pilot"

Best Edited One-Hour Series – Non-Commercial Television:

Anne McCabe - The Newsroom for "We Just Decided To (Pilot)"
Terry Kelley - Homeland for "The Choice"
Jordan Goldman - Homeland for "State of Independence"

Best Edited Miniseries or Film – Commercial Television:

Lucia Zucchetti - Game Change
Don Cassidy - Hatfields & McCoys Part 1
Walter Murch - Hemingway & Gellhorn

Best Edited Non-Scripted Series:

Andy Netley and Sharon Gillooly - Frozen Planet for "Ends Of The Earth"

Student Competition:

Michael Smith – AFI

References

External links
ACE Award 2013 at the Internet Movie Database

63
2013 film awards
2013 guild awards
2013 in American cinema